La Esperanza is a municipality in the Quetzaltenango department of Guatemala. It covers an area of 15.9 km2 at an altitude of 2465 metres. This municipality was founded on April 7th 1910.

References

External links
 La Esperanza website

Municipalities of the Quetzaltenango Department